Robert Dyer (1860 – 31 August 1950) was an Australian cricketer. He played eight first-class matches for South Australia between 1893 and 1896.

See also
 List of South Australian representative cricketers

References

External links
 

1860 births
1950 deaths
Australian cricketers
South Australia cricketers